The Chilean Sea is the portion of the Pacific Ocean lying west of the Chilean mainland. The official Chilean usage for Chilean Sea was defined on 30 May 1974 when the Diario oficial de la Republica de Chile published Supreme Decree #346, which declared that "the waters surrounding or touching the shores of the national territory shall be known as Mar Chileno."

The Chilean Sea contains significant amounts of phosphorite and manganese-iron nodules, which may be potential targets for future seafloor mining.

Presencial sea
The face sea, or heritage safeguard sea, is the maritime space that a certain coastal country demarcates, after an oceanopolitical appreciation, in order to indicate to third parties its zone of influence in the high seas adjacent to its exclusive economic zone, where its interests were or could be directly involved.

Without claims of sovereignty, by making a delimitation that includes the effective occupation of the high seas contiguous to its respective oceanic territory, the coastal state shows the interest in preserving said area from abusive uses or from certain activities that, due to its proximity, may affect the marine resources that inhabit its waters, especially, guarding the highly migratory straddling fishery resources from predation, and pollution of the marine habitat.

EEZ of Chile

Chile's EEZ includes areas around the Desventuradas Islands, Easter Island and the Juan Fernández Islands.

Gallery

See also
 Maritime history of Chile
 Insular Chile
 Islands of Chile
 Tricontinental Chile
 Chilean Antarctic Territory
 Geography of Chile
 Chilean–Peruvian maritime dispute
 Pedro Edmunds Paoa
 Pacific Islands Forum
 Easter Island
 Mapuche conflict
 Coordinadora Arauco-Malleco
 Wallmapu
 Patagonia
 Admapu
 Araucanía (historic region)
 Exclusive economic zone of Chile
 Mar presencial
 Mar presencial de Chile
 Mar argentino
 Tesis del mar de resguardo patrimonial de Argentina
 Espacio marítimo argentino
 Mar de Grau

References

Seas of the Pacific Ocean
Bodies of water of Chile